is a Japanese thriller film released in 2001 and directed by Shun Nakahara. It is based on the bestseller novel of the same title by Randy Taguchi.

Main cast
 Miwako Ichikawa - Yuki Asakura
 Miho Tsumiki - Ritsuko
 Houka Kinoshita - Takayuki Asakura
 Masahiko Akuta - Dr. Kunisada
 Mantarô Koichi - Yamagishi
 Jun Murakami - Jun Murakami

External links

2001 films
Films based on Japanese novels
Films directed by Shun Nakahara
2000s Japanese-language films
2000s Japanese films